The Quincy and Torch Lake Cog Railway is a ,  cog railway in Hancock, Michigan. It opened in May 1997 to transport tourists to the adit entrance of the Quincy Mine's Number 5 shaft. Its tram car has a capacity of 28 people and travels at a maximum grade of 35%. It is one of only a few rack railways in the United States.

History

Mining era

Prior to the creation of the current tourist tramway, there existed a tramway used by the Quincy Mine to transport ore down the hill to the Quincy Smelter. It consisted of two tracks with tramcars in counterbalance. In 1890 the tramway was replaced by the Quincy & Torch Lake Railroad.

Modern era

Before the current tram was added, tourists were transported to the adit entrance by van, an indirect and cumbersome method. The solution of a tram was suggested by the vice president of the Quincy Mine Hoist Association, James R. Vivian Sr. The U.S. Economic Development Administration provided $420,000 in funds with a matching $200,000 raised by the Hoist Association. Construction  began on April 12, 1996, and was completed on November 11, 1996. The tramway opened for use in May 1997.

The tramcar, designed by Phil Quenzi, was built by Royale Construction Inc. of Kearsarge, Michigan and the grading and tracking laying was carried out by MJO Construction of Hancock, Michigan. The project engineer was Robert D. Hitch, P.E. and the project manager was James R. Vivian Jr.

In the winter of 2009, the tram underwent a refurbishment, including new paint, new windows, and refurbished seats.

Details
It is made of red-painted steel, and has large windows on the sides and roof.

See also

 Chicago Tunnel Company
 Green Mountain Cog Railway
 List of rack railways
 Manitou and Pike's Peak Railway
 Mount Washington Cog Railway

References

External links

 Quincy & Torch Lake Cog Railway Image of the tram and railway.
 Quincy Mine Hoist Association

Rack railways in the United States
Transportation in Houghton County, Michigan
Tourist attractions in Houghton County, Michigan